Diane is a 1956 American historical drama film about the life of Diane de Poitiers, produced by Metro-Goldwyn-Mayer, directed by David Miller, and produced by Edwin H. Knopf from a screenplay by Christopher Isherwood based on a story by John Erskine. The music score was composed by Miklós Rózsa, and Robert H. Planck was the cinematographer, who filmed in CinemaScope and Eastmancolor. The exceptionally lavish costumes were designed by Walter Plunkett.

The film stars Lana Turner, Pedro Armendáriz, Roger Moore, and Marisa Pavan, and features Sir Cedric Hardwicke, Torin Thatcher, Taina Elg, John Lupton, Henry Daniell, Melville Cooper and an early film appearance by Stuart Whitman. It was Turner's last film under her longtime MGM contract and thus marked another stage in the decline of the studio star system.

Plot
The action is set in 16th-century France.

Diane de Poitiers (Lana Turner) becomes the mistress of Prince Henri (Roger Moore), second in line to the throne. Their liaison continues through Henri's arranged marriage to the Italian Catherine de' Medici (Marisa Pavan).

Unknown to Catherine, her Medici relations arrange the death of the Dauphin and Henri's ascent to the throne as King Henry II. The antagonism of the two women, abetted by Medici scheming, eventually results in the death of Henri. Catherine, now ruling as regent for her three young sons, banishes Diane but spares her rival's life in a gesture of mutual respect.

Cast
 Lana Turner as Diane de Poitiers
 Pedro Armendáriz as King Francis I of France
 Roger Moore as Prince Henri (later King Henry II)
 Marisa Pavan as Catherine de' Medici
 Sir Cedric Hardwicke as Ruggieri
 Torin Thatcher as Count de Brézé
 Taina Elg as Alys
 John Lupton as Regnault
 Marc Cavell as Piero
 Henry Daniell as Gondi
 Ronald Green as The Dauphin
 Sean McClory as Count Montgomery
 Geoffrey Toone as Duke of Savoy
 Michael Ansara as Count Ridolfi
 Melville Cooper as Court Physician
 Jamie Farr as Count Ridolfi's Squire
 Paul Préboist

Production

The film was based on a fifty-page unpublished manuscript called "Diane de Poitiers" by John Erskine, who died in 1951. Film rights were bought in 1939 by producer Edwin H Knopf, story editor for Sam Goldwyn. Knopf tried to get financing for the film but was unable.

In 1953 the project was reactivated. Knopf re-secured the film rights from Erskine's estate and took the project to Dore Schary, head of production at MGM, where Knopft had a deal. Schary agreed to finance. Greer Garson was originally mentioned as a possible lead. Schary also announced he hoped to get Greta Garbo to come out of retirement to play the role. The part eventually went to Lana Turner as the last role of her M-G-M contract.

Turner said Diane was an interesting woman "one who used her charm intelligently. Actually she was a forerunner of today's modern woman; she was Europe's first outdoor girl, a health fan and an advocate of the cold bath. She wasn't afraid to use her head, but was never caught with her brains showing."

Reception
Christopher Isherwood deplored the treatment of his screenplay, attributing the problems to interventions by the leading lady.

Miklós Rózsa created an arrangement of his music called "Beauty and Grace," and his score has been issued on compact discs by Film Score Monthly.

Box office
The film was an expensive failure at the box office – according to MGM records it made only $461,000 in the US and Canada and $771,000 elsewhere resulting in a loss of $2,660,000.

Home media
Diane was released to DVD by Warner Home Video on May 28, 2013 via the Warner Archive DVD-on-demand service.

See also
 List of American films of 1956

References

External links
 
 
 
 
 

American historical drama films
1956 films
Metro-Goldwyn-Mayer films
CinemaScope films
Biographical films about French royalty
Cultural depictions of Catherine de' Medici
1950s historical drama films
1950s English-language films
Films directed by David Miller
Films set in the 16th century
Films scored by Miklós Rózsa
1956 drama films
1950s American films